Limon is a statutory town that is the most populous municipality in Lincoln County, Colorado, United States.  The population was 1,880 at the 2010 United States Census.  Limon has been called the "Hub City" of Eastern Colorado because Interstate 70, U.S. Highways 24, 40, and 287, and State Highways 71 and 86 all pass through or near the town. The Limon Correctional Facility is part of the Colorado Department of Corrections system and is a major employer in the area with employment of roughly 350.  
Limon is listed as the official AASHTO control city for signs on Interstate 70 between Denver and Hays, Kansas, although westbound signs in both Colorado and Kansas often omit Limon and list the larger city of Denver.

Limon is the western terminus of the Kyle Railroad and it is here the shortline interchanges with the Union Pacific Railroad. Trains previously stopped at Limon Railroad Depot.

Highways 
Limon is connected by Interstate 70 east to Goodland, Kansas, Topeka, Kansas City, Missouri, and west to Denver (eastern beltway-E-470 -; Interstate 25 - ), Silverthorne, Winter Park, Frisco/Breckenridge (/), Vail, Steamboat Springs, Aspen, and Grand Junction. Interstate 70 is the major East-West Interstate between I-40 and I-80.
The Ports-to-Plains Corridor including US 40/287 south and Colorado Highway 71 to the north of Limon connects to Amarillo, Lubbock and Dallas to the south and Cheyenne, Wyoming and Rapid City, South Dakota and the Black Hills to the north without using congested highways. This corridor provides an uncongested alternative to Interstate 25 and Interstate 35 in moving freight and people north–south.

Colorado State Highway 71 connects south from Limon to Rocky Ford, La Junta and Pueblo.
U.S. Route 24 is a direct passage southwest from Limon to Colorado Springs.

Railroads 
Limon is served by Class I Union Pacific Railroad and the Kyle Railroad owned by Genesee & Wyoming, Inc.  The Kyle Railroad is a short-line railroad that runs from North Central Kansas into Eastern Colorado with Limon as the western terminus where it interchanges with the Union Pacific Railroad. With approximately 500 miles of track, Kyle offers interchanges with BNSF, NKCR and UP. The major commodities moving on the Kyle include wheat, soybeans, milo maize, alcohols, siding asphalt and roofing granules.

Railroads were the major factor for Limon’s original founding and location.  The  Kansas Pacific made its way across the plains from southern Kansas following the Smoky Hill Trail in 1870.  In 1888 the Chicago, Rock Island, and Pacific Railroad (now the Kyle Railroad) made its way west to east from Colorado Springs, entering Lincoln County and intersected the Kansas Pacific (now Union Pacific) at the present day location of Limon.  This union of the two railroads was the earliest founding of the “Hub City”.

Airports 

The Town of Limon has easy, uncongested access to commercial airports in Denver and Colorado Springs. The distance between Limon and Denver International Airport is 83 miles or about 75 minutes via Interstate 70. Colorado Springs Airport is located about 74 miles from Limon and about 80 minutes via U.S. Highway 24.

Limon Municipal Airport is a public use airport located within the Town of Limon on the eastern edge of town. The airport encompasses approximately 397 acres and is owned and operated by the Town of Limon. The airport is a general aviation airport utilized by a range of aircraft ranging from single-engine aircraft up to small sized multi-engine business jets.  Limon Municipal Airport is located at 39°16’29.2”N latitude and 103°39”57.1”W longitude. The Airport elevation is 5,374 feet mean sea level (MSL).  The current Runway Design Code for Runway 16/34 and ARC for the Limon Municipal Airport is B-I (Small). The current design aircraft for the airport is the Beech King Air 100. There are two runways at Limon Municipal Airport: 16 and 34. They are 4,700 feet long and 60 feet wide.  They are constructed of concrete with a published strength sufficient for 12,500 pound aircraft with single wheel gear.  The taxiway system at the airport consists of partial parallel taxiway A with connector taxiway A1, A2, and A3. The taxiways are 25 feet wide and are in good condition. The aircraft apron provides an area for based and transient aircraft parking. Limon Municipal Airport has approximately 6,010 square yards of apron with 20 aircraft tie-downs. The airport provides fueling facilities by credit or proprietary cards.

Education

Limon Schools

Limon Schools has a new K-12 facility that opened in the fall of 2015. The $22.5 million project built two stories of new classrooms that accommodate up to 600 students.

Limon Elementary School is a public coed school with 240 students in grades K-5. According to state standards, 82% of students at this school are considered proficient in math or reading.

Limon Junior-Senior High School has 233 students in grades 6-12. According to state standards, 77% of students at this school are considered proficient in reading. Graduation rate is 90%.

Morgan Community College
Morgan Community College: Limon Center serves Arickaree, Flagler, Genoa-Hugo, Karval, Kit Carson, Limon, and Woodlin high schools. It currently offers A.A., A.S., A.A.S. & A.G.S. degrees; Transfer courses; Nursing pre-requisites; Agriculture & Business Management; GED preparation & testing; Specialty classes for teacher re-licensure; EMS training; and Computer classes.

Limon Child Development Center
Limon Child Development Center (Limon Head Start) offers a full-day, full-year preschool program for children ages 3–5. There are various funding programs available for children including Head Start, Colorado Preschool Program (CPP), CCCAP through the Lincoln County Department of Human Services, and private pay tuition.

Geography
Although entirely in Lincoln County, Limon is located immediately east of the Elbert County line. It lies on the north side of Big Sandy Creek, a tributary of the Arkansas River, on the eastern edge of the Colorado Piedmont region of the Great Plains, and is near the eastern end of the Palmer Divide.

Climate
Limon has a semi-arid steppe climate (Köppen BSk) with cold, dry winters and warm, mildly wetter summers. Due to its location on the eastern plains, the town is often subject to severe, sometimes violent thunderstorms throughout the summer. Large hail, damaging winds, heavy rain, and tornadoes are common in the summer months. The high temperature reaches or exceeds  an average of 32.3 days a year and reaches or exceeds  an average of 0.8 days a year. The minimum temperature falls below the freezing point  an average of 195.9 days a year. Typically, the first fall freeze occurs by the fourth week of September, and the last spring freeze occurs by the third week of May. In a typical year, Limon receives  of precipitation, and there are 81.3 days of measurable precipitation.

Demographics

As of the 2010 census, there were 1,880 people, 828 households, and 476 families residing in the town. The racial makeup of the town was 93.2% White, 0.9% American Indian, 0.8% African American, 0.8% Asian, 0.1% Pacific Islander, 2.8% from some other race, and 1.5% from two or more races. 9.4% of the population was Hispanic or Latino of any race.

There were 828 households, out of which 32.9% had children under the age of 18 living with them, 41.9% were married couples living together, 4.7% had a male householder with no wife present, 10.9% had a female householder with no husband present, and 42.5% were non-families. 37.1% of all households were made up of individuals, and 18.0% had someone living alone who was 65 years of age or older. The average household size was 2.27, and the average family size was 3.00.

In the town, the population was spread out, with 27.4% under the age of 18, 8.4% from 18 to 24, 23.0% from 25 to 44, 25.0% from 45 to 64, and 16.2% who were 65 years of age or older. The median age was 37.6 years. For every 100 females, there were 90.7 males. For every 100 females age 18 and over, there were 85.6 males age 18 and over.

As of 2009, the median income for a household in the town was $40,903, and the median income for a family was $46,061. Males had a median income of $49,097 versus $31,615 for females. The per capita income for the town was $22,442. About 16.6% of families and 18.2% of the population were below the poverty line, including 25.5% of those under age 18 and 4.8% of those age 65 or over.

Porter Lynching
Limon was the site of a lynching on November 16, 1900. Preston Porter Jr, a sixteen-year-old African-American male, had confessed under duress to the murder of eleven-year-old Louise Frost who was Caucasian. Porter was apparently being held some 90 miles away in Denver, but was sent back to Limon by request of unspecified people and against the wishes of Sheriff Freeman. When the train carrying Porter stopped in Limon, sixteen men selected from a mob of 300 "marked by calmness and determination" took Porter from Freeman's custody despite the sheriff's protestations "in the name of law." Originally it was announced that Porter would be hanged but many in the crowd including R. W. Frost, the girl's father, objected "that such a death would be too easy." The method was left to Frost who decided upon burning at the stake. Frost also refused to allow mutilation of Porter's body before burning. While waiting for his execution, Porter sat next to a bonfire reading the Gospel of Luke from the Bible. Porter was chained to an iron railroad rail set in the ground on the exact spot where the murder had taken place and burned to death, the match to start the fire being set by the girl's father. Lynchings of this type were apparently rare, as reporters on the scene wrote: "The general sentiment expressed approves the execution of the negro, but deprecates the method adopted."

1990 Tornado
On June 6, 1990, an F3 tornado touched down near Matheson (about 16 miles west of Limon), tearing roughly east-northeast through fields. Minutes later, the then rain-wrapped tornado arrived, devastating the city. The storm injured 14 people, but remarkably no one was killed. Most of Limon's business district had been laid to ruins in just moments.

Governor Roy Romer declared Limon a disaster area the next day.

Limon successfully rebuilt its business district adding streetscaping, a new Town Hall, relocating a medical clinic and Limon Memorial Library, creating Hub City Senior Center and a new fire station.  Downtown Limon is now a thriving center of the community demonstrating the strength of this rural community.

Media

Print
The Limon Leader is the city's weekly newspaper, published by Hoffman Publications, LLC and has a circulation of about 3,200 copies.

Radio
The following radio stations are licensed to or broadcast from Limon:

AM

FM

Television
Limon is in the Denver television market.

See also

Outline of Colorado
Index of Colorado-related articles
State of Colorado
Colorado cities and towns
Colorado municipalities
Colorado counties
Lincoln County, Colorado
Cedar Point Village, an archaeological site

References

External links

Town of Limon website
CDOT map of the Town of Limon

Towns in Lincoln County, Colorado
Towns in Colorado